Edward Marczewski (15 November 1907 – 17 October 1976) was a Polish mathematician. He was born Szpilrajn but changed his name while hiding from Nazi persecution.

Marczewski was a member of the Warsaw School of Mathematics. His life and work after the Second World War were connected with Wrocław, where he was among the creators of the Polish scientific centre.

Marczewski's main fields of interest were measure theory, descriptive set theory, general topology, probability theory and universal algebra. He also published papers on real and complex analysis, applied mathematics and mathematical logic.

Marczewski proved that the topological dimension, for arbitrary metrisable separable space X, coincides with the Hausdorff dimension under one of the metrics in X which induce the given topology of X (while otherwise the Hausdorff dimension is always greater or equal to the topological dimension). This is a fundamental theorem of fractal theory. (Certain contributions to this development were also made by Samuel Eilenberg, see: Witold Hurewicz and Henry Wallman, Dimension Theory, 1941, Chapter VII.)

References

External links

1907 births
1976 deaths
20th-century Polish Jews
Warsaw School of Mathematics
People from Warsaw Governorate
University of Warsaw alumni
Academic staff of the University of Wrocław